Richard Christmas was a state legislator in Mississippi. He represented Copiah County in the Mississippi House of Representatives in 1874 and 1875.

He was born in North Carolina. He served in the 5th U.S. Colored Heavy Artillery.

Either a man born in Tennessee with the same name or one from North Carolina have been identified as likely being this Richard Christmas.

See also
African-American officeholders during and following the Reconstruction era

References

People from Copiah County, Mississippi
Members of the Mississippi House of Representatives
African-American state legislators in Mississippi
Year of death missing
Year of birth missing
African-American politicians during the Reconstruction Era